Taleporia borealis is a species of moth belonging to the family Psychidae.

It is native to Northern Europe.

References

Psychidae